Rothmaleria is a genus of flowering plants in the family Asteraceae.

Species
There is only one known species, Rothmaleria granatensis, native to Spain.

References

Flora of Spain
Monotypic Asteraceae genera
Cichorieae
Taxa named by Pierre Edmond Boissier
Taxa named by Augustin Pyramus de Candolle
Taxa named by Pius Font i Quer